Annie Chapelier (born 7 November 1967) is a French nurse anesthetist and politician who has been serving as a member of the French National Assembly since the 2017 elections, representing the department of Gard. From 2017 until 2020, she was a member of La République En Marche! (LREM). In May 2020, she was one of the 17 initial members of the short-lived Ecology Democracy Solidarity group.

Political career
In parliament, Chapelier serves on the Committee on Foreign Affairs. In addition to her committee assignments, she chairs the French Parliamentary Friendship Group with South Sudan.

Chapelier did not seek re-election in the 2022 French legislative election.

Political positions
In 2018, Chapelier joined other co-signatories around Sébastien Nadot in officially filing a request for a commission of inquiry into the legality of French weapons sales to the Saudi-led coalition fighting in Yemen, days before an official visit of Saudi Crown Prince Mohammed bin Salman to Paris. 

In June 2019, Chapelier was one of five members of the LREM parliamentary group who joined a cross-party initiative to legalize the distribution and use of cannabis.

In July 2019, Chapelier voted in favour of the French ratification of the European Union’s Comprehensive Economic and Trade Agreement (CETA) with Canada.

See also
 2017 French legislative election

References

1967 births
Living people
Deputies of the 15th National Assembly of the French Fifth Republic
La République En Marche! politicians
Ecology Democracy Solidarity politicians
21st-century French women politicians
Place of birth missing (living people)
Women members of the National Assembly (France)
Canadian emigrants to France